The 145th Massachusetts General Court, consisting of the Massachusetts Senate and the Massachusetts House of Representatives, met in 1927 and 1928.

Senators

Representatives

See also
 1928 Massachusetts gubernatorial election
 70th United States Congress
 List of Massachusetts General Courts

References

External links

 
 
 
 

Political history of Massachusetts
Massachusetts legislative sessions
massachusetts
1927 in Massachusetts
massachusetts
1928 in Massachusetts